The 1958 Yukon general election was held on 8 September 1958 to elect the five members of the Yukon Territorial Council. The council was non-partisan and had merely an advisory role to the federally appointed Commissioner.

Members elected

References

1958
1958 elections in Canada
Election
September 1958 events in Canada